The curse of the ninth is a superstition connected with the history of classical music. It is the belief that a ninth symphony is destined to be a composer's last and that the composer will be fated to die while or after writing it, or before completing a tenth.

History 
The curse of the ninth superstition originated in the late-Romantic period of classical music. According to Arnold Schoenberg, the superstition began with Gustav Mahler, who, after writing his Eighth Symphony, wrote Das Lied von der Erde, which, while structurally a symphony, was able to be disguised as a song cycle, each movement being a setting of a poem for soloist and orchestra. Then he wrote his Ninth Symphony and thought he had beaten the curse, but died with his Tenth Symphony incomplete.

This superstition, however, was only hatched by Mahler. Before him, Beethoven and Schubert had died before or while writing their tenth symphonies. Upon realizing this, Mahler created the curse of the ninth and led this superstition into popularity by seemingly proving it true. This superstition has, however, lost popularity, and while it is spoken about, proof of it has not happened recently as it did in the era of Beethoven and Mahler. As Maddy Shaw Roberts writes, "The Curse of the Nine is a great story, and it probably fueled a lot of the angst behind Mahler’s heart-wrenching symphonies. But perhaps it’s best to treat it as a superstition."

After Beethoven, Schubert and Mahler, some composers cited as examples of the curse include:
 Malcolm Arnold
 Kurt Atterberg
 Anton Bruckner (he completed 10 symphonies, but "Study Symphony" and "Symphony No.0" are not counted)
 Antonín Dvořák (only 5 of his symphonies were known during his lifetime)
 Alexander Glazunov
 Gustav Mahler (although he completed 10 symphonies if Das Lied von der Erde is seen as a symphony) 
 David Maslanka
 Vincent Persichetti
 Alfred Schnittke
 Roger Sessions
 Ralph Vaughan Williams

In 2012, composer Philip Glass stated, "Everyone is afraid to do a ninth. It is a jinx that people think about".

In popular culture 
The curse of the ninth symphony was addressed in the sixth episode of the 19th season of the British crime series Midsomer Murders in 2018.

See also 
 27 Club
 Macbeth curse
 Sweater curse
 Symphony No. 10 - for counterexamples.

References

Further reading 
 Cooke, Deryck. Gustav Mahler: An Introduction to His Music. Cambridge: Cambridge University Press, 1995.
 Lebrecht, Norman. Mahler Remembered. New York: W.W. Norton, 1987.
 Mahler-Werfel, Alma. The Diaries, translated by Antony Beaumont. Ithaca, NY: Cornell University Press, 2000.
 Dan Stehman, Roy Harris: An American Musical Pioneer. Boston: Twayne Publishers (1984): 163 – 169

Curses
Symphonies
Superstitions about numbers
Arnold Schoenberg